Patrol vehicle may mean:
 A vehicle used for patrolling: see the organization that is using the vehicle
 Among police, a police car

See also
Nissan Patrol, also called Nissan Safari, a make of four-wheel drive vehicle